Meadow Springs is a suburb of Mandurah, immediately northeast of Mandurah's central area. Alongside some of Mandurah's most recent land estates, it contains a large golf course, Catholic primary school, Anglican co-educational school, and a war veterans' estate. There are many parks and walking trails near the lake. The upcoming train station will provide convenient public transport, eliminating the need to drive into Mandurah to catch a train.

Shopping
Meadow Springs also contains a small shopping centre, with a Coles Supermarkets and previously a Target department store, separate from the main shopping complex.

Transport
Meadow Springs is serviced by Transperth bus routes operated by Transdev WA—the 558 (Mandurah to Rockingham) & 587 (Mandurah to Lakelands), both connecting the suburb to the Mandurah railway line. A future train station is planned at Gordon Road in the Business Industry area of Mandurah in Meadow Springs.

Education
Meadow Springs is home to three private schools, Frederick Irwin Anglican School (K-12), Assumption Catholic Primary School (K-6) and Mandurah Baptist College (K-12). Meadow Springs Primary School www.meadowspringsps.com, a brand new government school opened in 2012, It boasts a dental clinic and a special  education support centre.  It currently has a student population of over 900.

References

Suburbs of Mandurah